Johan Emil Kauppi (28 October 1875 – disappeared 1930) was a Finnish composer. His teachers included Jean Sibelius.

Background
Kauppi married a woman named Liina Lovisa Lindström in 1908.

He wrote two operas. The first, in 1925, was Päiväkummun pidot (The Feast at Solhaug), which was well received by critics. The second, in 1930, was Nummisuutarit (The Cobblers on the Heath), which received only poor reviews.

In October 1930, shortly after the premiere of Nummisuutarit, he disappeared and is thought to have committed suicide. Kauppi was last seen alive in Tammerfors on 24 October.

Compositions 
 2 operas
 6 operettas
 incidental music
 50 lieder
 20 choral works
 10 piano works
 chamber music

See also 
 List of people who disappeared

References

1875 births
1930 deaths
1930s missing person cases
Finnish composers
Finnish male composers
Missing people
Missing person cases in Finland
People from Turku and Pori Province (Grand Duchy of Finland)
People from Uusikaupunki
Year of death unknown